Peckoltia cavatica is a species of catfish in the family Loricariidae. It is native to South America, where it occurs in the Rupununi basin in Guyana. It is found in areas with large amounts of lateritic rock, and it is usually seen in holes and caves within the rock, which are also where it is thought to breed. P. cavatica's preference for such environments was notable enough to the authors of its 2005 description, Jonathan W. Armbruster and David C. Werneke, that the specific epithet bestowed upon it means "living in caves" in Latin. The species reaches 7.2 cm (2.8 inches) SL.

P. cavatica appears in the aquarium trade, where it may be referred to and marketed by the L-number of L-076, although not all sources are in agreement that the number in question corresponds to P. cavatica.

References 

Ancistrini
Fish described in 2005